Lionel Potillon (born 10 February 1974 in Cluny) is a retired French football defender.

Honours
Paris Saint-Germain
 UEFA Intertoto Cup: 2001

Sochaux
Coupe de France: 2006–07

References

External links

1974 births
Living people
French footballers
Louhans-Cuiseaux FC players
AS Saint-Étienne players
Paris Saint-Germain F.C. players
La Liga players
Real Sociedad footballers
FC Sochaux-Montbéliard players
Ligue 1 players
Ligue 2 players
Association football defenders